Ikuo Shirahama (born 20 December 1958) is a Japanese professional golfer.

Shirahama played on the Japan Golf Tour, winning twice.

Professional wins (3)

Japan Golf Tour wins (2)

Japan PGA Senior Tour wins (1)
2011 Koujun Classic Senior Tournament

External links

Japanese male golfers
Japan Golf Tour golfers
Sportspeople from Tokyo
1958 births
Living people